The Viking 34 is a Canadian sailboat, that was designed by C&C Design and first built in 1973.

The Viking 34 is a development of the Viking 33, with a  taller mast, 4% more sail area, a  deeper Peterson-style keel and a revised interior layout.

Production
The design was built by Ontario Yachts in Canada between 1973 and 1982, but it is now out of production.

Design

The Viking 34 is a small recreational keelboat, built predominantly of fiberglass, with wood trim. It has a masthead sloop rig, a raked stem, a raised reverse transom, an internally-mounted spade-type rudder controlled by a tiller and a fixed swept Peterson-style fin keel.

The design displaces  and carries  of ballast.

The design has a PHRF racing average handicap of 129 with a high of 132 and low of 126.

See also
List of sailing boat types

Related development
Viking 33

Similar sailboats
Beneteau 331
Beneteau First Class 10
C&C 34
C&C 34/36
Catalina 34
Coast 34
Columbia 34
Columbia 34 Mark II
Creekmore 34
Crown 34
CS 34
Express 34
Hunter 34
San Juan 34
S&S 34
Sea Sprite 34
Sun Odyssey 349
Tartan 34-2
Tartan 34 C
UFO 34

References

Keelboats
1970s sailboat type designs
Sailing yachts
Sailboat types built by Ontario Yachts
Sailboat type designs by C&C Design